The Esso Refinery at Milford Haven was an oil refinery situated on the Pembrokeshire coast in Wales. Construction started in 1957 and the refinery was opened in 1960 by the Duke of Edinburgh. Construction cost £18 million and the refinery had the initial capacity to process 4.5 million tons of crude oil a year.

Background 
As originally conceived the refinery worked in conjunction with Esso's older, larger refinery at Fawley on Southampton Water. Milford Haven refinery supplied the west coast and Fawley the rest of the country. Milford Haven also supplemented Fawley's fuel oil deliveries to the London area. The refinery shipped semi-refined heavy gas oil to Fawley for further refining. There were also shipments to Ireland and northern Europe. Most of the refinery's crude came from the Persian Gulf shipped in tankers such as the Esso Scotia of 249,952 deadweight tons.

Design 
The Milford Haven refinery was a 'simple' refinery designed to produce a small range of products, these included:

 Propane
 Butane
 petrols
 turbo jet fuels
 auto diesel
 gas oil
 fuel oils

The refinery was designed to blend into the area. Storage tanks were located within folds of the landscape, A ground flare was provided to eliminate the visual intrusion of an elevated flare. 

The jetty was 1200 yards long extending into the haven.

The refinery occupied an area of 375 acres.

Air cooling by fans was used to cool oil products, these reduced the amount of water that was required to be handled.

The refining distillation capacity over the operational life of the refinery was as follows.

The labour force was 350 upon opening in 1960 and had fallen to 280 by 1970. The peak labour force during construction was 3,500.

Most of the product from the refinery, about 95 per cent, was sent out by ship. However, the refinery was connected to the national rail network. Trains carrying liquefied gas were sent to the Midlands and Scotland. During the period January to June 1969, there were 656 ships delivering to or from the Esso refinery, handling 2.81 million tons of oil products.

Closure 
The refinery closed down in March 1983. Today, the site has been converted by the owners ExxonMobil into the South Hook LNG terminal.

See also
 Gulf Refinery, Milford Haven
 Milford Haven Refinery, owned by Amoco/Murco
Pembroke Refinery, owned by Texaco
Oil refineries in the United Kingdom

References

Oil refineries in the United Kingdom
ExxonMobil buildings and structures
Buildings and structures in Milford Haven